Raising Hope is an American sitcom that aired from September 21, 2010, to April 4, 2014, on Fox. Following its first season, the show received two nominations at the 63rd Primetime Emmy Awards. Martha Plimpton was nominated for Outstanding Lead Actress in a Comedy Series, and Cloris Leachman was nominated for Outstanding Guest Actress in a Comedy Series.
Plimpton also won the 2011 Satellite Award for Best Actress in a Comedy Series.

The fourth season premiered Friday, November 15, 2013, at 9:00 pm Eastern/8:00 pm Central with back-to-back episodes. On March 10, 2014, Fox canceled Raising Hope, and the series finale aired April 4, 2014.

Premise
James "Jimmy" Chance is a 23-year-old living in the quirky fictional town of Natesville, who impregnates a serial killer during a one-night stand. Earning custody of his unexpected daughter, Hope, after the mother is sentenced to death, Jimmy relies on his unorthodox but well-intentioned family for support in raising her.

Cast and characters

 Lucas Neff as James "Jimmy" Bon Jovi Chance, Hope's father. A good-natured, wide-eyed 23-year-old who is clueless about raising a child and everything else. Jimmy goes to Howdy's Market in Natesville to get items for baby Hope, where he meets Sabrina. 
 Martha Plimpton as Virginia Slims Chance. Hope's paternal grandmother, Jimmy's mother, and Burt's wife. Virginia became pregnant with Jimmy at age fifteen, delivering him when she was sixteen. Virginia works as a maid, cleaning houses of upper-class people while the Chances appear to live just above the poverty line.
 Garret Dillahunt as Engleburt “Burt” Jebbidiah Chance. Hope's paternal grandfather, Jimmy's father, and Virginia's husband. Burt conceived Jimmy with Virginia when he was seventeen. He has a lawn care/pool cleaning business with Jimmy as his assistant.
 Shannon Woodward as Sabrina Chance (née Collins), Jimmy's coworker and eventual wife and Hope's adoptive mother. 
 Cloris Leachman as Barbara June "Maw Maw" Thompson (recurring season 1, starring seasons 2–4), Virginia's 84-year-old grandmother, Jimmy's great-grandmother, and Hope's great-great-grandmother. Her dementia is a plot line of several episodes and forces her granddaughter to have to take care of her, while Virginia and Burt live in Maw Maw's house rent free.
 Gregg Binkley as Barney Hughes (recurring season 1, starring seasons 2–4), Manager of the store where Jimmy and Sabrina work.
 Baylie and Rylie Cregut as Hope Chance (born Princess Beyonce Carlyle), Jimmy's and Lucy's daughter and adopted daughter of Sabrina, Virginia and Burt's granddaughter and Maw Maw's great-great-granddaughter.

Series overview

Development and production
In June 2009, Fox announced it had booked a put pilot commitment with show creator Greg Garcia.

Actress Olesya Rulin was originally cast as Sabrina, the love interest for Jimmy, and Kate Micucci was added to the cast as Jimmy's cousin. The pilot was filmed in December 2009. In March 2010, Fox decided to recast two roles from the pilot. Shannon Woodward replaced Rulin as Sabrina. Also recast was the role of Jimmy's cousin, changing from Micucci to male actor Skyler Stone as Mike. With this, Micucci's role changed from Jimmy's cousin to become Shelley, Sabrina's cousin.

Fox green-lit the pilot to series with an order in mid-May 2010 for a fall premiere in its 2010–11 television schedule.

On January 10, 2011, Fox renewed Raising Hope for a second season. On April 9, 2012, Raising Hope was renewed for a third season. On March 4, 2013, Raising Hope was renewed for a fourth season. On March 10, 2014, Fox announced the cancellation of the show after four seasons.

Reception

Critical reception
Raising Hope has received positive reviews from critics. The show's first season received an average score of 75 out of 100 on Metacritic, meaning it received "generally favorable reviews." 
Tom Gilatto of People Weekly called the show the best new sitcom of the season, favorably comparing it to Malcolm in the Middle. Mary McNamara of the Los Angeles Times was lukewarm towards the show, stating that "Raising Hope is funny, sweet, occasionally provocative, and occasionally over-the-top in a regrettable way." James Poniewozik of Time Magazine was upbeat, stating that "Neff is amiably charming, Dillahunt and Plimpton give their characters a realism that belies the pilot's often-contemptuous jokes, and maybe 20% of the first episode shows a sweet-heartedness that rises above the easy white-trash humor." While not all of the reviews were positive, they were mostly positive by the end of the first season. Much of the show's praise went to the performances of Martha Plimpton and Garret Dillahunt.

The second season of Raising Hope premiered on September 20, 2011, on Fox, moving to 9:30 pm from its original 8:00 pm time slot, due to the acquisition of New Girl. The second season received similar positive reviews to the first, with Matt Roush of TV Guide calling it "A treat for anyone who loves a good call-back to classic sitcoms."

Ratings

Awards and nominations

International broadcasts

In the United Kingdom, Sky1 picked up the broadcast rights and added the show to its 2010–2011 UK & Ireland autumn schedule, beginning in November 2010.

In Australia, Ten originally broadcast the series before moving it  to Eleven.

In Portugal, the series premiered on January 29, 2011, on Fox Life.

In Brazil, the series premiered on September 22, 2010, on FOX.

In Italy, the series premiered on February 3, 2011, on Fox. The Italian title is Aiutami Hope!. 

In the Czech Republic, the series broadcasts on HBO. This show premiered on February 1, 2011. The Czech title is Vychovávat Hope.

In Latin America, the series broadcasts on I.Sat. The show premiered in March 2011.

In Canada, the first season aired on the Global Television Network at the same time as Fox in the United States. In 2011, City bought rights from the Global Television Network, and began broadcasting the show. On the morning show that City airs, Breakfast Television, they announced on May 29, 2011, that the series will start airing at 8:00 pm on Tuesdays instead of 9:30 pm on Tuesdays due to other Fox series Glee moving to Thursdays at 9:00pm. This started on September 18, 2012.

In Finland, the first season aired on Sub on January 10, 2013. The Finnish title is Isän Tyttö.

In Germany, the series broadcasts on RTL Nitro. This started on September 10, 2012.

In Bosnia, Serbia and Croatia series was broadcast on Fox Adria. In January, 2018 RTL 2 picked up series for Croatia.

References

External links

 

2010s American single-camera sitcoms
2010 American television series debuts
2014 American television series endings
Fox Broadcasting Company original programming
Mass media portrayals of the working class
Television series by 20th Century Fox Television
Television series about families
Television shows filmed in Los Angeles
English-language television shows
Parenting television series